The Scandinavian Journal of Gastroenterology is a monthly peer-reviewed medical journal covering the field of gastroenterology. It is published by Informa and was established in 1966. The editor in chief is Helge Waldum. According to the Journal Citation Reports, the journal has a 2013 impact factor of 2.329.

References

External links 
 

Publications established in 1966
Gastroenterology and hepatology journals
Taylor & Francis academic journals
Monthly journals
English-language journals